Eustathius of Sebaste was bishop of Sebastia in Armenia (modern Sivas, Turkey) during the fourth century.

He was originally a monk, and is said to have been the first who acquainted the Armenians with an ascetic life. For this reason some persons ascribed to him the work on Ascetics, which is usually regarded as the production of Saint Basil of Caesarea.

He must have been a contemporary of Constantine the Great, for Nicephorous states that although he had signed the decrees of the Council of Nicaea, he yet openly sided with the Arians. (Epiphanius Ixxv. 1, etc.; Sozomenus iii. 14; Nicephor. ix. 16.) Eustathius died after 377.

Eustathius was one of the few patristic authors to endorse the complete abolition of slavery. Eustathius was the teacher of Macrina and Basil, who both emphasized asceticism and the rejection of slavery and social injustice.

References

Bibliography 
 
 

Arian bishops
4th-century bishops in Roman Anatolia
Christian abolitionists